Hymenobacter nivis  is a Gram-negative, aerobic, rod-shaped and non-motile bacterium from the genus of Hymenobacter which has been isolated from red snow from the Antarctica.

References

External links
Type strain of Hymenobacter nivis at BacDive -  the Bacterial Diversity Metadatabase

nivis
Bacteria described in 2016